The 2020–21 James Madison Dukes men's basketball team represented James Madison University in the 2020–21 NCAA Division I men's basketball season. The Dukes, led by first-year head coach Mark Byington, played their home games at the newly opened Atlantic Union Bank Center in Harrisonburg, Virginia as members of the Colonial Athletic Association. In a season limited due to the ongoing COVID-19 pandemic, they finished the season 13–7, 8–2 in CAA play to earn a share of the regular season championship. They lost in the quarterfinals of the CAA tournament to Elon. 

Byington was named the CAA Coach of the Year while guard Matt Lewis was named the CAA Player of the Year.

Previous season
The Dukes finished the 2019–20 season 9–21, 2–16 in CAA play to finish in last place. They lost in the first round of the CAA tournament to Elon.

On March 9, 2020, the school announced that head coach Louis Rowe would not return as head coach for the Dukes. A few weeks later, the school named Georgia Southern head coach Mark Byington the Dukes' new head coach.

Offseason 
Guard Matt Lewis opted to test the waters in the 2020 NBA draft, however he ultimately returned to the Dukes for his senior season.

Departures

Preseason 
In the preseason CAA poll, the Dukes were picked to finish ninth while Matt Lewis was chosen the preseason CAA Player of the Year.

Roster

Schedule and results 

|-
!colspan=12 style=| Regular season

|-
!colspan=9 style=| CAA tournament
|-

|-

Sources

References

James Madison Dukes men's basketball seasons
James Madison Dukes
James Madison Dukes men's basketball
James Madison Dukes men's basketball